Francois Jacobus Grobler (born 11 June 1992) is a South African professional rugby union player, currently playing with the . His regular position is scrum-half.

Career

Youth

Grobler played for Eastern Province at youth level, representing them at the Under–16 Grant Khomo Week in 2008 and at the Under-18 Craven Week in 2010.

Leopards

Grobler played for the  team in the 2011 Under-19 Provincial Championship competition, starting all twelve their matches. In 2012, he was included in the senior squad for the 2012 Currie Cup First Division competition.

After making four appearances in the 2013 Currie Cup First Division season, he then joined the  side for their 2013 Under-21 Provincial Championship campaign.

Eastern Province Kings

In June 2014, he was selected on the bench for the  side to face  during a tour match during a 2014 incoming tour. He came on after 53 minutes as the Kings suffered a 12–34 defeat. He scored his first try for the EP Kings in their first match of the 2015 Vodacom Cup season, a 19–27 defeat to defending champions .

References

South African rugby union players
Living people
1992 births
Rugby union players from Port Elizabeth
Eastern Province Elephants players
Leopards (rugby union) players
Rugby union scrum-halves